Glycerol kinase, encoded by the gene GK, is a phosphotransferase enzyme involved in triglycerides and glycerophospholipids synthesis.

Glycerol kinase catalyzes the transfer of a phosphate from ATP to glycerol thus forming glycerol 3-phosphate:

ATP + glycerol <=> ADP + sn-glycerol 3-phosphate

Adipocytes lack glycerol kinase so they cannot metabolize the glycerol produced during triacyl glycerol degradation.  This glycerol is instead shuttled to the liver via the blood where it is:
 Phosphorylated by glycerol kinase to glycerol 3-phosphate.
 Converted from glycerol 3-phosphate to dihydroxyacetone phosphate (DHAP) via glycerol 3-phosphate dehydrogenase. DHAP can participate in glycolysis or gluconeogenesis.

Enzyme regulation

This protein may use the morpheein model of allosteric regulation.

Structure

Glycerol Kinase (alternative name, ATP:glycerol 3-phosphotransferase or Glycerokinase) adopts a ribonuclease H-like fold consisting of an alpha-beta 2-layer sandwich of CATH family 3.30.420.40. , there were 20 structures of this protein in the PDB, most of which are homodimeric.

See also 
 Glycerol
 Kinase

External links

References 

EC 2.7.1